was a town located in Santō District, Niigata Prefecture, Japan.

As of 2003, the town had an estimated population of 14,160 and a density of 242.30 persons per km². The total area was 58.44 km².

On April 1, 2005, Koshiji, along with the town of Oguni (from Kariwa District), the village of Yamakoshi (from Koshi District), the town of Nakanoshima (from Minamikanbara District), and the town of Mishima (also from Santō District), was merged into the expanded city of Nagaoka.

Transportation

Railway
  JR East - Shin'etsu Main Line
  -  - 
  Echigo Kotsu Nagaoka Line(:ja:越後交通長岡線) (until 1975)
 Raikōji
  JNR Uonuma Line(:ja:魚沼線) (until 1984)
 Raikōji

Highway

Local attractions
 Momijien(:ja:もみじ園)
 Hotokusan Inari Taisha Shrine(:ja:宝徳山稲荷大社)

Dissolved municipalities of Niigata Prefecture
Nagaoka, Niigata